William Amhurst Tyssen-Amherst, 1st Baron Amherst of Hackney,  (25 April 1835 – 16 January 1909) was a British Conservative Member of Parliament and collector of books and works of art.

Background and education
Born William Amhurst Daniel-Tyssen, he was the eldest son of William George Daniel-Tyssen, High Sheriff of Norfolk in 1843, who was the son of William George Daniel, of Foley House, near Maidstone, Kent, High Sheriff of Kent in 1825, and his wife Amelia Amherst, the daughter of Captain John Amherst and Mary Tyssen, heiress of Foulden Hall, Norfolk. Amherst's mother was Mary, daughter of Andrew Fountaine, of Narford Hall, Norfolk. In 1852, he and his father assumed by Royal licence the surname of Tyssen-Amhurst. However, in 1877 he again changed it, to Tyssen-Amherst, also by Royal licence. Tyssen-Amherst was educated at Eton and Christ Church, Oxford.

Political career
In 1880, he was elected to Parliament for West Norfolk, a seat he held until 1885, and then represented South West Norfolk until 1892. The latter year he was raised to the peerage as Baron Amherst of Hackney, in the County of London, with remainder, in default of male issue, to his eldest daughter Mary and her issue male. Apart from his parliamentary career Tyssen-Amherst also served as High Sheriff of Norfolk in 1866 and as deputy lieutenant of Middlesex and was a justice of the peace for Norfolk, Middlesex and Westminster.

Collector
Tyssen-Amherst is chiefly remembered as a collector of books, manuscripts, antique furniture and other works of art. He became famous for his Egyptian collection. In his country home, Didlington Hall, he built a museum for his rapidly growing Egyptian collection. In 1906, he was forced to sell a large portion of his collection after discovering that his estate and certain trust funds had been entirely dissipated at the hands of an untrustworthy solicitor, Charles Cheston, under whose management they had been placed. He lived only six weeks following the first Sotheby's auction from this collection.

His name is noted at the Carter gallery display of Swaffham Museum in Norfolk, suggesting that Tyssen-Amherst's collection of ancient papyri and Egyptian figures was seen by a young Howard Carter. The Museum records reveal that in 1882 he exhibited six "life size Egyptian figures" at Swaffham assembly rooms. A copy of the catalogue describes the figures he exhibited which included a figure of a Bedouin chief. He also exhibited a Thutmose III brick circa 1330bc, excavated from the banks of the Nile. Amherst's collection included the lower section of a 20th Dynasty tomb robbery papyri otherwise described as the Leopold II and Amherst Papyrus, which is in the possession of the Morgan Library & Museum, New York.

His rare book collection included the "only genuine perfect copy known" of Recuyell of the Historyes of Troye, King Charles I's personal copy of the Cambridge Bible, and a Gutenberg Bible (No. 45).

Family
Lord Amherst of Hackney married Margaret Susan Mitford, only child of Admiral Robert Mitford, in 1856. Susan Mitford was a lineal descendant of politician Robert Mitford and Philadelphia Wharton, first cousin (once removed) of poet and journalist John Mitford, third cousin (three times removed) of both English Attorney General Lord Redesdale and William Mitford, a sixth cousin (twice removed) to the "Mitford Sisters", and a distant cousin of author Mary Russell Mitford.
They had seven daughters:
Mary Rothes Margaret ("May"), born 1857, who succeeded to his title;
Sybil Margaret ("Sib"), born 1858;
Florence Margaret ("Flo" or "Fluff"), born 1860;
Margaret Mitford ("Maggie"), born 1864;
Alicia Margaret ("Ally"), born 1865, a botanist and author, married Evelyn Cecil, 1st Baron Rockley;
Geraldine Margaret ("Cherry"), born 1867, married Malcolm Drummond of Megginch, parents of John Drummond, 15th Baron Strange and Victoria Drummond;
Beatrice Margaret ("Bee"), born 1869.
All of the girls were named after their mother, Margaret.

Lord Amherst died in London, in January 1909, aged 73, and was succeeded in the barony according to the special remainder by his eldest daughter Mary.

He was the great-grandfather of American heir William Amherst Vanderbilt Cecil, operator of the Biltmore Estate in North Carolina.

See also
 Amherst Papyrus
 Papyrus Amherst 3a
 Papyrus Amherst 3b
 Uncial 076

Notes

External links

 
 William Amhurst Tyssen-Amherst
 The Amhersts of Didlington
 Didlington Estate, Norfolk

Amherst of Hackney, William Amhurst Tyssen-Amherst, 1st Baron
Amherst of Hackney, William Amhurst Tyssen-Amherst, 1st Baron
1
People educated at Eton College
Alumni of Christ Church, Oxford
Members of the Parliament of the United Kingdom for English constituencies
UK MPs 1880–1885
UK MPs 1885–1886
UK MPs 1886–1892
UK MPs who were granted peerages
Amherst of Hackney, William Amhurst Tyssen-Amherst, 1st Baron
High Sheriffs of Norfolk
English justices of the peace
Peers of the United Kingdom created by Queen Victoria
English collectors